Jamalpur Zila School is a public high school in Jamalpur District and one of the oldest schools in Bangladesh.

History
Jamalpur Zila School was founded by T. A. Dono, the Sub Divisional Officer (SDO) of Jamalpur. It was upgraded to entrance level and named Dono High School in 1881. The school was placed under government pay roll in 1882 and renamed Jamalpur Dono English High School. In 1912 it was renamed Jamalpur Government School and nationalised by the government. The school had two hostels, one for Muslim students and another for Hindu students. The school has seven labs of which two are computer labs. It is one of the best schools in terms of graduation rates and grades in Bangladesh.

References

1881 establishments in India
High schools in Bangladesh
Educational institutions established in 1881
Boys' schools in Bangladesh
Organisations based in Jamalpur District